Diane Claire Guthrie-Gresham (born October 24, 1971) is a retired female track and field athlete from Jamaica, who specialized in the Long Jump and Heptathlon during her career.

Diane holds the National Collegiate Athletics Association championship meet record for women's Heptathlon, as well as the Caribbean record for that event. Competing for George Mason University, she compiled a total of 6527 at the University of Tennessee's Tom Black Track in Knoxville, Tennessee, between 2–3 June 1995. She won her second NCAA title with that mark, and also broke Jackie Joyner-Kersee's NCAA meet record. Joyner-Kersee had set the record of 6390 points in Houston in 1983 when she was competing for UCLA, by 137 points.

Lifetime best: 6527(13.86w, 1.86/6-1¼, 13.80/45-3½, 24.91 [3728], 6.92/22-8½w), 49.04/160-11, 2:20.82 [2799])

College
She was born in Saint Elizabeth Parish, Jamaica. While at George Mason, she won the Broderick Award (now the Honda Sports Award) as the nation's best female collegiate track and field competitor in 1995.

Achievements

References

External links 

1971 births
Living people
Jamaican female long jumpers
Jamaican heptathletes
Athletes (track and field) at the 1991 Pan American Games
Athletes (track and field) at the 1992 Summer Olympics
Athletes (track and field) at the 1996 Summer Olympics
Olympic athletes of Jamaica
Pan American Games gold medalists for Jamaica
Pan American Games medalists in athletics (track and field)
People from Saint Elizabeth Parish
Medalists at the 1991 Pan American Games
George Mason Patriots women's track and field athletes